Telekom Malaysia Football Club or commonly known as TMFC is a now defunct Malaysian football club, which  originated from Malacca until the club moved their base to Kuala Lumpur on their last season. The club's final home ground was the 25,000 capacity MPPJ Stadium. The club used to play in the top division of Malaysian football, the Malaysia Super League until its final season in 2006–07 Malaysia Super League.

The club was owned by Telekom Malaysia (TM), a leading integrated information and communications group in Malaysia.

The club regular kit colours was orange and blue for shirts, shorts and socks.

History
Telekom Malaysia Football Club or commonly known as TMFC was founded as Telekom Melaka Football Club in 1994. The club exist as a football club under Malacca branch of Telekom Malaysia. Until the club owner parent company going into rebrands in 2005, the club was rebrands as TM football club to solidify its brands going forwards.

The club home ground originally was the Hang Tuah Stadium before moving into a bigger stadium, the Hang Jebat Stadium in Paya Rumput.

The club compete in Malaysia FAM Cup until the end of 1998. The club won the Malaysia FAM Cup twice where the club won it in 1994 and 1996 season. The club was also qualified to compete in Malaysia FA Cup in 1997 and 1998 although the club was knockout in First Round for both season.

In 1999, the club was promoted to Malaysia Premier League 2 in 1999 season. The club finished the season in eight place. The club continue to compete in the league until the end of 2002 season.

In 2003, the club was promoted to play in Malaysia Premier League 1 after secure a promotion as runner-up of 2002 Malaysia Premier League 2.

In 2004, FAM introduced Malaysia Super League to succeed Malaysia Premier League 1. The club did not win the promotion to it and was then put into the new second-tier league, the Malaysia Premier League for 2004 season.

The club then won promotion to 2005–06 Malaysia Super League. The club compete in the top division for the remaining season before withdrew from the league at the end of 2006–07 Malaysia Super League season.

In their final season, the club moved their based from Malacca to Kuala Lumpur and moved into a new stadium, the MPPJ Stadium in Petaling Jaya.

Telekom Malaysia submitted its application for the TM FC to exit from the Malaysian League to the Football Association of Malaysia as the company decided to realign its position in contributing towards the nation's sports development from a sponsorship perspective as opposed to owning and running a football club. Telekom Malaysia was the Malaysian League title sponsor from 2004 to 2010 season.

Stadium
TM FC play their final season in MPPJ Stadium in Petaling Jaya. Before move to the last stadium, the club home ground was the Hang Tuah Stadium before later on move to the new Hang Jebat Stadium. After the club decided to relocate to Kuala Lumpur, the club has chosen MPPJ Stadium as their home ground for the remaining season.

Honours
 Malaysian League / Malaysian Semi-Pro Football League Division 1 / Malaysia Premier League / Malaysia Premier League 1 / Malaysia Super League
 Winners: -
 Runners-up (1): 2005–06

 Malaysian Semi-Pro Football League Division 2 / Malaysia Premier League 2 / Malaysia Premier League
 Winners: -
 Runners-up (2): 2002, 2004

 Malaysia FAM Cup / Malaysia FAM League
 Winners (2): 1994, 1996
 Runners-up:

References

Defunct football clubs in Malaysia
1994 establishments in Malaysia
Association football clubs established in 1994
Works association football clubs in Malaysia